In Boolean logic, a formula is in conjunctive normal form (CNF) or clausal normal form if it is a conjunction of one or more clauses, where a clause is a disjunction of literals; otherwise put, it is a product of sums or an AND of ORs. As a canonical normal form, it is useful in automated theorem proving and circuit theory.

All conjunctions of literals and all disjunctions of literals are in CNF, as they can be seen as conjunctions of one-literal clauses and conjunctions of a single clause, respectively. As in the disjunctive normal form (DNF), the only propositional connectives a formula in CNF can contain are and, or, and not. The not operator can only be used as part of a literal, which means that it can only precede a propositional variable or a predicate symbol.

In automated theorem proving, the notion "clausal normal form" is often used in a narrower sense, meaning a particular representation of a CNF formula as a set of sets of literals.

Examples and non-examples

 
 
 
 

For clarity, the disjunctive clauses are written inside parentheses above. The constants true and false are denoted by the empty conjunct and one clause consisting of the empty disjunct, but are normally written explicitly.

The following formulas are not in conjunctive normal form:
 , since an OR is nested within a NOT
 
 , since an AND is nested within an OR

Every formula can be equivalently written as a formula in conjunctive normal form. The three non-examples in CNF are:

Conversion into CNF

Every propositional formula can be converted into an equivalent formula that is in CNF. This transformation is based on rules about logical equivalences: double negation elimination, De Morgan's laws, and the distributive law.

Since all propositional formulas can be converted into an equivalent formula in conjunctive normal form, proofs are often based on the assumption that all formulae are CNF. However, in some cases this conversion to CNF can lead to an exponential explosion of the formula. For example, translating the following non-CNF formula into CNF produces a formula with  clauses:

In particular, the generated formula is:

There exist transformations into CNF that avoid an exponential increase in size by preserving satisfiability rather than equivalence. These transformations are guaranteed to only linearly increase the size of the formula, but introduce new variables. For example, the above formula can be transformed into CNF by adding variables  as follows:

An interpretation satisfies this formula only if at least one of the new variables is true. This means that every model that satisfies this formula also satisfies the original one. This means that the original formula and the result of the translation are equisatisfiable but not equivalent.

An alternative translation, the Tseitin transformation, includes also the clauses .

First-order logic

In first order logic, conjunctive normal form can be taken further to yield the clausal normal form of a logical formula, which can be then used to perform first-order resolution.
In resolution-based automated theorem-proving, a CNF formula 

See below for an example.

Computational complexity

An important set of problems in computational complexity involves finding assignments to the variables of a boolean formula expressed in conjunctive normal form, such that the formula is true. The k-SAT problem is the problem of finding a satisfying assignment to a boolean formula expressed in CNF in which each disjunction contains at most k variables. 3-SAT is NP-complete (like any other k-SAT problem with k>2) while 2-SAT is known to have solutions in polynomial time. As a consequence, the task of converting a formula into a DNF, preserving satisfiability, is NP-hard; dually, converting into CNF, preserving validity, is also NP-hard; hence equivalence-preserving conversion into DNF or CNF is again NP-hard.

Typical problems in this case involve formulas in "3CNF": conjunctive normal form with no more than three variables per conjunct. Examples of such formulas encountered in practice can be very large, for example with 100,000 variables and 1,000,000 conjuncts.

Converting from first-order logic

To convert first-order logic to CNF:
Convert to negation normal form.
Move NOTs inwards by repeatedly applying De Morgan's law. After that, a  may occur only immediately before a predicate symbol.
Standardize variables
For sentences like  which use the same variable name twice, change the name of one of the variables. This avoids confusion later when dropping quantifiers.
Skolemize the statement
This is the only step that preserves only satisfiability rather than equivalence. It eliminates all existential quantifiers.
Drop all universal quantifiers.

As an example, the formula saying "Anyone who loves all animals, is in turn loved by someone" is converted into CNF (and subsequently into clause form in the last line) as follows (highlighting replacement rule redexes in ):

Informally, the Skolem function  can be thought of as yielding the person by whom  is loved, while  yields the animal (if any) that  doesn't love. The 3rd last line from below then reads as " doesn't love the animal , or else  is loved by ".

The 2nd last line from above, is the CNF.

Notes

See also
 Algebraic normal form
 Disjunctive normal form
 Horn clause
 Quine–McCluskey algorithm

References
 
 
 Paul Jackson, Daniel Sheridan: Clause Form Conversions for Boolean Circuits. In: Holger H. Hoos, David G. Mitchell (Eds.): Theory and Applications of Satisfiability Testing, 7th International Conference, SAT 2004, Vancouver, BC, Canada, May 10–13, 2004, Revised Selected Papers. Lecture Notes in Computer Science 3542, Springer 2005, pp. 183–198
 G.S. Tseitin: On the complexity of derivation in propositional calculus. In: Slisenko, A.O. (ed.) Structures in Constructive Mathematics and Mathematical Logic, Part II, Seminars in Mathematics (translated from Russian), pp. 115–125. Steklov Mathematical Institute (1968)

External links
 
 Java tool for converting a truth table into CNF and DNF
 Java applet for converting to CNF and DNF, showing laws used 

Normal forms (logic)